Torpaqkörpü (also, Torpaq körpü, Toprakh-Kerpi, Torpakerki, Torpakerpi, and Torpakhkërpyu) is a village in the Qusar Rayon of Azerbaijan.

References 

Populated places in Qusar District